Sonia is a Papuan language of Papua New Guinea.

References 

Bosavi languages
Languages of Southern Highlands Province
Languages of Western Province (Papua New Guinea)